O Guarani may refer to:

The Guarani (O Guarani), 1857 Brazilian novel by José de Alencar
O Guarani (1910 film), a 1910 short silent Portuguese film
O Guarani (1912 film), a 1912 silent Brazilian film
O Guarani (1916 film), a 1916 silent Brazilian film
O Guarani (1922 film), a 1922 Brazilian silent film
O Guaraní, a 1926 Brazilian silent film
O Guarani (1979 film), a 1979 Brazilian film
O Guarani (1997 film), a 1997 Portuguese film
O Guarani (2008 film), a 2008 Brazilian short documentary film
O Guarani (TV series), a 1959  Brazilian TV series
O Guarani (TV mini-series), a 1991 Brazilian TV mini-series